The dharni is a still used ancient unit of mass, used in Nepal, of about  seer. It was divided into 2 bisauli (बिसौलि), 4 boṛi (बोड़ि), or 12 pāu (पाउ). The United Nations Statistical Office gave an approximate equivalence of 2.3325 kilograms (5.142 pounds avoirdupois) in 1966.

References

External links
Sizes.com

Units of mass
Customary units in India
Obsolete units of measurement